The following are the national records in speed skating in Hungary maintained by the Hungarian National Skating Federation.

Men

Women

References

External links
Hungarian National Skating Federation website

National records in speed skating
speed skating
Records
Speed skating
Speed skating-related lists